Menecrates of Ephesus (330–270 BC) was a Greek didactic poet of the Hellenistic period.  He wrote a poem called the Works which was modeled upon Hesiod's Works and Days and included a discussion of bees based on the work of Aristotle.  He was the teacher of the astronomical poet Aratus.

Notes

References
Edition of his surviving works: Supplementum Hellenisticum, ed. Hugh Lloyd-Jones; P J Parsons; H -G Nesselrath; J U Powell. Berlin & New York : W. de Gruyter, 1983 

Ancient Greek poets
3rd-century BC Greek people
3rd-century BC poets
Ancient Ephesians
Ancient Greek didactic poets
330 BC births
270 BC deaths